Girls' High School may refer to:

Africa

Zimbabwe
 Girls High School, Harare, Zimbabwe

Asia

India

 Girls' High School and College, Allahabad, Uttar Pradesh, India
 Girls' High School, Kanpur, formally Methodist High School, Kanpur, Uttar Pradesh, India

Sri Lanka
 Girls' High School, Kandy, Sri Lanka

United States
 Girls High School (Atlanta), later Roosevelt High School, a former high school in Atlanta, Georgia
 Girls' High School, a former high school building in Brooklyn, New York
 Girls’ High School (Boston, Massachusetts), a former high school in Boston, Massachusetts
 Girls High School, Philadelphia, formally Philadelphia High School for Girls, in Philadelphia, Pennsylvania